|}
{| class="collapsible collapsed" cellpadding="0" cellspacing="0" style="clear:right; float:right; text-align:center; font-weight:bold;" width="280px"
! colspan="3" style="border:1px solid black; background-color: #77DD77;" | Also Ran

The 1980 Epsom Derby was the 201st annual running of the Derby horse race. It took place at Epsom Downs Racecourse on 4 June 1980.

The race was won by Etti Plesch's American bred Henbit at odds of 7/1. Ridden by Willie Carson and trained at West Ilsley by Dick Hern, Henbit would be the second Derby winner in two years for the trainer/jockey duo. While the winning margin of just three quarters of a length was unremarkable, that Henbit returned with a fractured cannon bone in his off-fore leg, thought to have occurred a furlong and a half from the finish led his trainer to describe him as a "very brave horse". Furthermore, the winning time of 2:34.77 was the fastest since Nijinsky won in 1970.

Race details
 Sponsor: none
 Winner's prize money: £166,820
 Going: Fast
 Number of runners: 24
 Winner's time: 2 minutes, 34.77 seconds

Full result

Winner details
Further details of the winner, Henbit:

 Foaled: 28 March 1977, in America
 Sire: Hawaii; Dam: Chateaucreek (Chateaugay)
 Owner: Etti Plesch
 Breeder: Helen Drake Jones

Form analysis

Two-year-old races
Notable runs by the future Derby participants as two-year-olds in 1979:
 Blast Off - 2nd in Prix Greffulhe
 Bozovici - 2nd in Seaton Delaval Stakes
 Braughing - 3rd in Gimcrack Stakes
 Hello Gorgeous - 1st in Futurity Stakes, 1st in Royal Lodge Stakes
 Master Willie - 2nd in Acomb Stakes
 Moomba Masquerade - 3rd in Futurity Stakes
 Monteverdi – 1st in National Stakes, 1st in Dewhurst Stakes
 Noble Shamus – 1st in Railway Stakes, 3rd in National Stakes
 Rankin - 1st in Solario Stakes
 Ribo Charter – 3rd in Prix de Condé
 Star Way - 1st in Chesham Stakes, 2nd in Royal Lodge Stakes, 3rd in Seaton Delaval Stakes
 Tyrnavos - 2nd in Dewhurst Stakes, 1st in Roberre Trophy Stakes 
 Water Mill - 2nd in Horris Hill Stakes

The road to Epsom
Early-season appearances in 1980 and trial races prior to running in the Derby:
 Garrido - 1st in Derby Italiano
 Hello Gorgeous - 1st in Dante Stakes
 Henbit - 1st in Guardian Classic Trial, 1st in Chester Vase
 Julius Caesar - 1st in Prix Noailles
 Master Willie - 1st in Easter Stakes, 2nd in Dante Stakes
 Monteverdi – 2nd in Greenham Stakes, 2nd in McCairns Trial Stakes
 Moomba Masquerade - 2nd in Chester Vase
 Nikoli - 1st in Irish 2000 Guineas, 1st in McCairns Trial Stakes
 Pelerin - 1st in Glasgow Stakes
 Rankin - 2nd in Predominate Stakes
 Ribo Charter - 2nd in Lingfield Derby Trial
 Running Mill - 1st in Heath Stakes
 Saint Jonathon - 1st in Roseberry Stakes
 Star Way - 2nd in Craven Stakes
 Tyrnavos - 1st in Craven Stakes
 Water Mill - 3rd in Dante Stakes

Subsequent Group 1 wins
Group 1 / Grade I victories after running in the Derby.

 Master Willie - Benson and Hedges Gold Cup (1980), Coronation Cup (1981), Eclipse Stakes (1981)
 Pelerin - Grosser Preis von Baden (1981)
 Tyrnavos – Irish Derby (1980)

Subsequent breeding careers

Leading progeny of participants in the 1980 Epsom Derby.

Stallions of Classic winners
Star Way (9th) Exported to New Zealand - Sire of 18 Group One winners
 Shankhill Lass - 1st The Thousand Guineas (1985)
 Waverley Star - 2nd Cox Plate (1986)
 Nimue - 1st New Zealand 1000 Guineas (1992)
 Shoal Creek - Dam of Encosta De Lago

Stallions of Group/Grade One winners
Master Willie (2nd)
 Hollywood Dream - 1st Premio Presidente della Repubblica (1996), 1st Deutschland-Preis (1996)
 Make A Stand - 1st Champion Hurdle (1997)
 Jungle Gold - 3rd Irish 1000 Guineas (1988)
 Be My Master - 2nd Derby Italiano (1986

Stallions of National Hunt horses
Henbit (1st)
 Kribensis - 1st Champion Hurdle (1990)
 Sybillin - 2nd Christmas Hurdle (1990)
Julius Caesar (7th)
 Soir de Mai - 1st Prix Georges de Talhouët-Roy (1988)
 Runway Romance - 2nd Anniversary Hurdle (1991)

Other Stallions
Tyrnavos (12th) - Dihistan (1st 1986 Hardwicke Stakes), Andrios (2nd 1984 Chesham Stakes), Akaaleel (2nd 1985 Chesham Stakes), Tartamuda (Dam of Tartak)Hello Gorgeous (6th) - Libertine (3rd 1987 Poule d'Essai des Pouliches), Franco Forte (2nd 1987 Premio Parioli) - later exported to BrazilMonteverdi (14th)  - Exported to America - Exported to Venevuela - Concert Hall (2nd 1984 National Stakes), Laird Of Montrose (3rd 1985 Middle Park Stakes)Nikoli (8th) - Exported to America - Exported to Uruguay - Air Display (2nd 1986 Hollywood Derby)Water Mill (10th) - Exported to Australia - Innocent Lady (Dam of Justice Prevails)Moomba Masquerade (11th) - Exported to South AfricaSaint Johnathon (13th) - Exported to AustraliaPrince Spruce (15th) - Exported to ItalyBlast Off (18th) - Exported to VenezuelaNoble Shamus (19th) - Exported to AmericaRunning Mill (21st) - Exported to TurkeyMarcello (23rd) - Exported to Argentina

References

External links
 Colour Chart – Derby 1980

Epsom Derby
Epsom Derby
Epsom Derby
Epsom Derby
 1980
1980s in Surrey